Lake Valhalla is a glacial lake located in the Okanogan-Wenatchee National Forest of the state of Washington. Positioned adjacent to the Pacific Crest Trail, the lake and its surrounding areas are popular for hiking, climbing and other recreational activities.

See also 
 Lichtenberg Mountain
 Mount McCausland

References

External links
 

Valhalla